Gregg Saretsky (born 1959 in Châteauguay, Quebec) is the former president and CEO of WestJet, a carrier based in Calgary, Alberta.  
He served in that position from April 2010 to March 8, 2018, after the resignation of Sean Durfy.

He grew up in a Montreal suburb to a French mother and a German father. He moved with his family to Richmond, British Columbia in 1970. He acquired a Bachelor of science in microbiology and biochemistry in 1982 and a master of business administration in 1984, both at University of British Columbia. 1985-1998 he worked with Canadian Airlines International Ltd. (formerly Pacific Western Airlines and CP Air), rising to vice president roles for Airports and Marketing. From 1998-2008 he was an executive at Seattle based Alaska Airlines Inc. In mid 2009 he joined WestJet Airlines Ltd. as vacation vice-president; in April 2010 he became CEO of the airline. 

Saretsky is married and has three children. He has also two older brothers who are commercial pilots, one with Cathay Pacific Airways Ltd. and the other with Air Canada.

Awards and recognitions

Business Person of the Year for 2012 by Alberta Venture magazine.

References

External links
Westjet: Gregg Saretsky, president and chief executive officer
University of British Columbia alumni: Gregg Saretsky, BSc 1982, MBA 1984

Canadian airline chief executives
WestJet people
UBC Sauder School of Business alumni
Canadian people of German descent
Canadian people of French descent
1959 births
Living people
People from Châteauguay